Arthur Cooper (16 March 1921 – 2008) was an English footballer who played at left-half for Port Vale between 1941 and 1947.

Career
Cooper played for Shelton St. Mark's and Shelton Labour Club, before joining Port Vale in October 1941. He played regular football in the war leagues, but lost his place in September 1946 and only played the four matches in the Football League Third Division South in the 1946–47 season. He was released from The Old Recreation Ground by manager Gordon Hodgson in April 1947 with one goal in 71 appearances in all competitions for the club.

Career statistics
Source:

References

1921 births
2008 deaths
People from Etruria, Staffordshire
Footballers from Stoke-on-Trent
English footballers
Association football midfielders
Port Vale F.C. players
English Football League players